This is a list of New Zealand television series. Shows included feature from TVNZ, Discovery New Zealand, Māori Television, Prime, Sky, PBS, and CTV.

Current shows

Drama
The Brokenwood Mysteries (2014–present)
The Cul de Sac (2016–present) 
Dear Murderer (2017–present) 
The Gulf (2019–present) 
The Market (2005-present)

Sports
 CRC Motorsport 
 Big Angry Fish (2012–present)
 The Crowd Goes Wild 
 Fishing & Adventure (2013–present) 
 ITM Fishing Show

Religious
 NZ Destiny Church 
 NZONE Focus 
 Praise Be

Soap opera
 Shortland Street (1992–present)

Lifestyle and documentary
 Country Calendar (1966–present)
 Fair Go (1977–present)
 Intrepid Journeys (2003–present) 
 Motorway Patrol (1999–present)
 Reunited (2022–present)
 SCU: Serious Crash Unit (2004–present)
 Sensing Murder (2006–present)
 Ten 7 Aotearoa (2002–2023)

Children's
 The Adventures of Tumeke Space (2021–present) 
 The Barefoot Bandits (2016–present) 
 Brain Busters (2020–present) 
 Bumble (2020–present)
 Darwin & Newts (2018–present) 
 The Drawing Show (2019–present) 
 The Exceptional Squad (2020–present) 
 Jandal Burn (2019–present) 
 Kai Five (2018–present) 
 Quimbo's Quest (2019–present) 
 Takaro Tribe (2017–present) 
 Tales of Nai Nai (2019–present) 
 The Vloggingtons (2018–present) 
 What Now (1981–present)

RealityThe Bachelor NZ (2015–present)The Block NZ (2012–present)Dancing with the Stars (2005–2009, 2015, 2018–present)Haka Life (2017-present)My Kitchen Rules NZ (2014, 2017–present)Survivor NZ (2017–present)

Comedy7 Days (2009–present)Agent Anna (2013–present)Funny Girls (2015–present)Girl vs. Boy (2012–present)Golden Boy (2019–present) Mean Mums (2019–present) Taskmaster NZ (2020–present)

News20/20 60 Minutes The Crowd Goes Wild A Current Affair (2021–present)MaraePRIME News: First at 5:30 (2004–present) The Project (2017–present)Q+A (2009–present)Seven Sharp (2013–present)Sunday (2002–present)Tagata Pasifika Te Karere (1990s–present)

Past shows

Drama
 800 Words (2016–2018)
 The Almighty Johnsons (2011–2013)
 AFK (2015–2018) 
 The Blue Rose (2013)
 Burying Brian (2008)
 City Life (1996–1998)
 Close to Home (1975–1983)
 A Country GP (1984–1985)
 Cover Story (1994–1996)
 The Cult (2009)
 Dirty Laundry (2016) 
 Doves of War (2006) 
 Duggan (1997–1999)
 Filthy Rich (2016–2017)
 Gloss (1987–1990)
 Go Girls (2009–2013)
 The Insider's Guide To Happiness (2005)
 The Insider's Guide To Love (2006)
 Interrogation (2005)
 Jackson's Wharf (1999–2001)
 Marlin Bay (1991–1994)
 Mataku (2002-2005)
 Mercy Peak (2001–2003)
 Mortimer's Patch (1980–1984)
 Nothing Trivial (2011–2015)
 Orange Roughies (2006–2007)
 Outrageous Fortune (2005–2010)
 Pukemanu (1971)
 Rude Awakenings (2007)
 Shark in the Park (1989–1992)
 Step Dave (2013–2015)
 Street Legal (2000–2003)
 The Strip (2002–2003)
 Tales of the South Seas (1997)
 This Is Not My Life (2010)
 Westside (2015–2020)

Comedy
 Bro'Town (2004–2009)
 Diplomatic Immunity (2009)
 Gliding On (1981)
 Hounds (2012)
 The Jaquie Brown Diaries (2008–2009)
 Jono and Ben (2012–2018)
 The Jono Project (2010–2012)
 Melody Rules (1993–1995)
 Pulp Sport (2003–2009)
 The Ring Inz (2017-2019)
 Seven Periods with Mr Gormsby (2005–2006)
 Short Poppies (2014)
 Super City (2011–2012)
 Wanna-Ben (2010–2011)
 Willy Nilly (2003)

Lifestyle and documentary
 Brunch (2012)
 Dark Tourist (2018)
 Epitaph (2001)
 Ghost Hunt (2005–2006)
 Holmes (1989–2004)
 Home Front (2000-2005) 
 Mitre 10 Changing Rooms 
 Mitre 10 D.I.Y. Rescue 
 Mitre 10 Dream Home (1999–2009) 

Game showsBlind Date Captive (2004)Deal or No Deal (2007–2008)The Weakest Link (2001–2002)Wheel of Fortune (1991–2009)Who Wants to Be a MillionaireReality100 Hours (2002)The Apprentice New Zealand (2010)Flatmates (1997)Going Straight (2003)Henderson to Hollywood (TV mini-series) (2007) MasterChef New Zealand (2010–2014)The X Factor (2013, 2015)

Children's
 Amazing Extraordinary Friends (2006–2008)
 Being Eve (2001–2002)
 Bumble (1999–2002) (expected to be brought back in revival series in late 2020)
 Children of the Dog Star (1984)
 Children of Fire Mountain (1979)
 Fanimals (2018–2019) 
 The Kids from OWL (1980s)
 The Killian Curse (2006)
 Maddigan's Quest (2006)
 Mirror, Mirror (New Zealand and Australian co-production) (1995)
 The Son of a Gunn Show (1992–1995)
 Sticky TV (2002–2017)
 Terry and the Gunrunners (1985)
 The Tribe (1998–2003)
 Under the Mountain'' (1981) - miniseries

References

New Zealand

Television series
New Zealand television-related lists